This is a list of coats of arms of Germany.

German Federal States

The origins of the coats of arms of German federal states covers the historical context for the current arms of the German länder.

After the end of the Third Reich, Germany had lost significant parts of its territory and was divided into four occupation zones. Several former states were split between two or more of these zones. The historical state of Prussia, which spread over more than half the territory of Germany, was officially abolished by the Allies; and several new states were formed from its former lands while other parts were annexed by Poland or the USSR.

Some of these states were direct successors of former states, although the former borders changed; others were new constructions. In some cases parts of former states were declared states; in other cases, parts of different states formed a new state. Only the historic city-states of Hamburg and Bremen survived the end of the Third Reich without significant changes of their territory.

The Federal Republic was joined by the Saarland in 1957 and by five states of the former German Democratic Republic in 1990. Each of these states adopted new arms upon joining the federation, by combining the centuries-old coats of the former states (or ruling houses) from whose territories they were formed.

Overview and historical versions of state arms

Coat of arms of Baden-Württemberg
Coat of arms of Baden-Württemberg
Coat of arms of Hohenstaufen
Coat of arms of the Elector Palatine, one shield used in full arms
Coat of arms of Wurzburg, one shield used in full arms
Coat of arms of Baden, predecessor state of the Weimar Period and before; one shield used in full arms
Coat of arms of Württemberg-Baden, predecessor state of the Weimar Period
Coat of arms of Württemberg-Hohenzollern, predecessor state of the Weimar Period
Coat of arms of the Kingdom of Württemberg, historical state
Coat of arms of Hohenzollern, one shield used in full arms
Preceding states (Zollern, Hohenzollern-Sigmaringen, Hohenzollern-Hechingen and the Province of Hohenzollern) until Württemberg-Hohenzollern used these arms; rulers chose variations and additions thereupon.
Coat of arms of the Electorate of the Palatinate, one shield used in full arms
Coat of arms of Austria (lesser), one shield used in full arms

Coat of arms of Bavaria
Coat of arms of Bavaria
Coat of arms of the Kingdom of Bavaria and preceding Wittelsbach dynasty
Coat of arms of Kraiburg
Franconian rake, one charge used in full arms
Coat of arms of the Elector Palatine, one charge used in full arms

Coat of arms of Berlin
Coat of arms of Berlin
Historical arms

Coat of arms of Brandenburg
Coat of arms of Brandenburg
Historical arms, including the Province of Brandenburg

Coat of arms of Bremen
Coat of arms of Bremen
Historical arms

Coat of arms of Hamburg
Coat of arms of Hamburg
Historical arms

Coat of arms of Hesse
Coat of arms of Hesse
Historical arms

Coat of arms of Lower Saxony
Coat of arms of Lower Saxony
Saxon Steed, principal charge and motif
Coat of arms of the Free State of Brunswick (1918–1946), predecessor state
Coat of arms of the Duchy of Brunswick (1815–1918) (full and lesser), predecessor state
Coat of arms of the Duchy of Brunswick-Lüneburg (1235–1708) predecessor state
Coat of arms of the Electorate of Brunswick-Lüneburg (Hanover), predecessor state
Coat of arms of the Kingdom of Hanover (1814–1866), predecessor state
Coat of arms of the Prussian Province of Hanover (1868–1946), predecessor state
Coat of arms of the Free State of Oldenburg (1918–1946), predecessor state
Coat of arms of Oldenburg (1180–1918), predecessor state
Coat of arms of the Free State of Schaumburg-Lippe (1918–1946), predecessor state
Coat of arms of Schaumburg-Lippe (1643–1918), predecessor state
Coat of arms of Schaumburg (1110–1640), predecessor state

Coat of arms of Mecklenburg-Vorpommern
Coat of arms of Mecklenburg-Vorpommern
For history, see Mecklenburg-Schwerin, Mecklenburg-Strelitz and Duchy of Pomerania, predecessor states.

Coat of arms of North Rhine-Westphalia
Coat of arms of North Rhine-Westphalia
For history, see also Rhine Province, Province of Westphalia and Principality of Lippe, predecessor states.

Coat of arms of Rhineland-Palatinate
Coat of arms of Rhineland-Palatinate
Wheel of Mainz, principal charge
Coat of arms of the Elector Palatine, principal charge
Coat of arms of the Archbishop of Mainz (historical)

Coat of arms of Saarland
Coat of arms of Saarland
Coat of arms of Nassau-Saarbrücken, predecessor state and one of the quarters of the arms
Coat of arms of the Duchy of Lorraine, predecessor state, predecessor state and one of the quarters of the arms
Coat of arms of the Archbishop of Trier, predecessor state, predecessor state and one of the quarters of the arms
Coat of arms of the Elector Palatine, predecessor state, predecessor state and one of the quarters of the arms
Coat of arms of the Saar under French protectorate (1947–1956)
Coat of arms of the Saar under League of Nations mandate (1920–1935)

Coat of arms of Saxony
Coat of arms of Saxony
Historical arms

Coat of arms of Saxony-Anhalt
Coat of arms of Saxony-Anhalt
Historical arms, including the Prussian province of Saxony
Coat of arms of Anhalt, predecessor Princedom

Coat of arms of Schleswig-Holstein
Coat of arms of Schleswig-Holstein
Coat of arms of the Dukes of Holstein-Gottorp, predecessor dukedom

Coat of arms of Thuringia
Coat of arms of Thuringia

Historical coats of arms

ColoniesCoats of arms of German colonies''' were prepared but never formally granted.

In 1914, the diplomat Wilhelm Solf proposed that Germany's colonies be assigned flags and arms, like the flags and arms used by the British colonies. Solf believed that these would serve to advertise Germany's power, and would encourage German pride amongst the colonials. Kaiser Wilhelm was enthusiastic about the idea, and drafts were prepared for his inspection by Solf in conjunction with the Heraldry Office and the Duke of Mecklenburg. However, World War I broke out before the project was finalised, and the arms were never actually taken into use. This was in part because giving the colonies their own insignia in times of war could have let them have symbols to rally around in rebellion. Following the defeat in the war, Germany lost all its colonies and the prepared arms were therefore never granted.

The arms all followed a similar style. In chief was placed the Imperial Eagle, bearing a shield with the arms of the House of Hohenzollern. In the main part of the shield was a colony specific symbol, such as an elephant for the colony of Kamerun. Above the shield was placed the German State Crown (which was merely symbolic, and did not physically exist). Early drafts included a scroll displaying the name of the colony or protectorate in German, but given the unheraldic nature of such a name scroll, it is unlikely this would have been part of the final blazon.

See also 

 Germany

References

External links 
 Kolonialflaggen
 Flag use in German colonies
 Flags of the World - Former Colonies and other Overseas Territories (Germany)